Bamarni is a village and sub-district in the Dohuk Governorate in Kurdistan Region, Iraq. It is located in the Sapna valley in the district of Amadiya.

The village is located in a mountain gorge and has a strong Naqshbandi presence.

History
Bamarni is first attested as an Assyrian Christian village with the name Beṯ Mūrdānī in the 10th-century Life of Rabban Joseph Busnaya whose inhabitants adhered to the Church of the East. A Jewish community also previously resided at Bamarni. In the early 20th century, Bamarni was the residence of the Naqshbandi Sheikh Bahā al-Dīn, whose house and takiyya was destroyed by the British in August 1919, but was later permitted to return. At this time, there were six or seven Jewish households.

In December 2020, Miran Abdulrahman was appointed mayor of the sub-district, making her the first female mayor in the Dohuk Province.

See also
Bamarni Air Base

References

Bibliography

 
 
 

Populated places in Dohuk Province
Kurdish settlements in Iraq
Historic Jewish communities in Iraq
Historic Assyrian communities in Iraq
Subdistricts of Iraq